Barbara Swanner was the head coach of the women's basketball team at Louisiana State University (LSU) from 1979 to 1982.

Swanner took over for head coach Jinks Coleman midway through the 1978–1979 season and led the Lady Tigers (then the BenGals) to a 57-50 record over the next 3½ years. Her teams went to three Association of Intercollegiate Athletics for Women (AIAW) Tournaments. She was succeeded by the legendary Sue Gunter in 1982.

Head coaching record

References 

American women's basketball coaches
LSU Lady Tigers basketball coaches
Living people
Year of birth missing (living people)
Place of birth missing (living people)
Female sports coaches